Michael J. Sullivan (born  1943/1944) is an American politician who served as the Wyoming Labor Commissioner and was active in local politics in Cheyenne, Wyoming.

Early life and education

Michael J. Sullivan was born  1943/1944. He graduated from Louisiana University with a bachelor's degree in business and graduated from the University of Northern Colorado with a master's degree in business. He served in the United States Air Force and retired as a colonel.

Career

Department of Labor

From 1970 to 1975, Sullivan served as a Wage and Hour Inspector for the Wyoming Department of Labor. On May 14, 1975, Wyoming Labor Commissioner Vernie Martin announced the appointment of Sullivan as Deputy Labor Commissioner.

In 1983, Martin was put on trial for charges of attempting to defraud Wyoming through a false travel voucher. Sullivan was selected by Governor Edgar Herschler to serve as acting Labor Commissioner and served until his retirement in 1995.

Local politics

In 1976, Sullivan filed to run for one of two city council seats in Cheyenne, Wyoming, from Ward 3. In the primary election he placed first ahead of incumbent council members, Delmer Woods and Victoria Anderson. In the general election he and Carol E. Clark placed first and second defeating both of the incumbents. In 1980, he ran in Cheyenne's mayoral election but placed fourth behind incumbent Mayor Don Erickson, former Mayor Bill Nation, and City Council President John Rogers. In 1982, he unsuccessfully ran for a seat on the Cheyenne city council.

In 1977, the Cheyenne city council voted in favor of a maximum 10¢ per hour on-street parking fee. Sullivan opposed the fee and instead supported an optional sales tax. In 1980, he launched a petition drive to place a referendum on a mineral severance tax onto the ballot with the support of the AFL–CIO and the Wyoming Employee Associations.

Later life

In 2002, Sullivan announced that he would seek the Democratic nomination for the Wyoming House of Representatives in the 8th district. He won in the Democratic primary, but lost in the general election to incumbent Republican Representative Larry Meuli.

Electoral history

References

1943 births
Living people
Wyoming Democrats